Tebenna lapidaria is a moth in the family Choreutidae. It was described by Edward Meyrick in 1909. It is found in Bolivia.

References

Choreutidae
Moths described in 1909